Triatoma recurva is a species of kissing bug in the family Reduviidae. It is found in Central America and North America. Like all of the kissing bugs in the genus Triatoma, it is an obligate blood feeder that primarily targets vertebrates. However, individuals can consume the hemolymph of arthropods, and can develop to maturity on a diet consisting entirely of cockroaches.

References

Further reading

 
 

Reduviidae
Articles created by Qbugbot
Insects described in 1868